"Mac 10" is a song by American rapper Trippie Redd featuring fellow American rappers Lil Baby and Lil Duke. It was released as the second single from Redd's second studio album ! (2019) on July 24, 2019, with an accompanying music video. The song was written by the artists alongside producers Wheezy and Bobby Raps.

Background 
Trippie Redd debuted the song at one of his concerts in March 2019, performing it with Lil Duke. The title of the song references the MAC-10 machine pistol. In an interview with Zane Lowe, Redd talked about his collaboration with Duke and Lil Baby, saying:

Baby was sleep on the couch and Duke was up with me, we were just smoking and vibing then Wheezy came in the studio, I asked him for a beat. I did the chorus, Duke got on it then I woke Baby's ass up told him to record his shit… He took damn near 30 minutes but he woke up out his sleep and got that out the way.

Charts

Certifications

References 

2019 singles
2019 songs
Trippie Redd songs
Lil Baby songs
Songs written by Trippie Redd
Songs written by Lil Baby
Songs written by Wheezy (record producer)
Song recordings produced by Wheezy (record producer)